Phillip Mills (born 13 February 1955 in Auckland) is a former track and field athlete and businessman from New Zealand. He is the founder, executive director, and former chief executive of Les Mills International and a founder of Pure Advantage, a green business lobby group.

Sport
Mills' family were all New Zealand representative at the Olympic and Commonwealth Games in track and field. His father Les was a multiple representative at both Games. Phillip, his mother, Colleen, and younger sister, Donna, were all selected for the 1974 Commonwealth Games while Les was controversially omitted from the team.

Mills competed in the 110m hurdles at the 1974 Commonwealth Games in Christchurch and the 110m and 400m hurdles at the 1978 Commonwealth Games in Edmonton, Alberta. He attended the University of California, Los Angeles (UCLA) on a track and field scholarship and graduated with a degree in philosophy in 1978.

Business
On returning to New Zealand in 1979, Mills took an increasing role in the Les Mills fitness club business founded by his parents, Les and Colleen Mills, in 1968. The Les Mills business floated on the stock market in 1984 and was taken over by an investment company in 1987. After the share market crash that year, Mills bought the business back. Phillip Mills continues to operate the Les Mills gym business in New Zealand.  As of May 2015, there are 11 Les Mills fitness facilities in New Zealand and a total of 50,000 Les Mills members.

In the early 1980s, Mills developed an exercise-to-music choreographed set of exercises and commercialized them based on licensing instructors to lead classes.

In 2004, Phillip Mills was Ernst & Young's New Zealand Entrepreneur of the Year.  In 2005, Les Mills International was named New Zealand Services Exporter of the Year by NZ Trade and Enterprise. In 2007, he and his wife, Jackie Mills, co-authored the book Fighting Globesity – A Practical Guide to Personal Health and Global Sustainability.

In 2009 he won Kea New Zealand's World Class New Zealand Award for New Thinking.

In 2011 Mills was presented with an Australian Fitness Network Lifetime Achievement Award. In recent years Phillip Mills was named on The National Business Review (NBR) Rich List in 2011. 

As of March 2015, there were 18 different programs distributed across 100 countries. Phillip Mills has also developed a group fitness management system for maximizing the commercial benefits of the Les Mills programs.

Mills’ views on fitness industry trends and the secrets of the most successful fitness facilities are regularly shared across the fitness industry.

In 2022, Mills and his father Les and wife Jackie Mills were jointly inducted into the New Zealand Business Hall of Fame.

The environment and sustainability
Mills is an advocate for “green” business. His belief in the importance of sustainability has been widely publicised in New Zealand, and he has authored several articles on the financial benefits of a clean, green economy along with the need for New Zealand to take action on climate change.

He is the founder of Pure Advantage, a group of New Zealand business leaders lobbying for green economic policy. The Pure Advantage Trust has recently commissioned a group of world-leading economists to review New Zealand's green growth opportunities.

Works and publications
In 2007 Mills and his wife, Dr. Jackie Mills MD, published Fighting Globesity – A Practical Guide To Personal Health and Global Sustainability (Random House).

References

New Zealand businesspeople
Aerobic exercise
Living people
New Zealand male hurdlers
Athletes (track and field) at the 1974 British Commonwealth Games
Athletes (track and field) at the 1978 Commonwealth Games
Commonwealth Games competitors for New Zealand
1955 births